The Manitoba underwing, Catocala manitoba or Catocala praeclara manitoba, is a moth of the family Erebidae. It is found in Manitoba.

The larvae feed on Populus and Salix.

References

External links
Species info

Moths described in 1908
manitoba
Moths of North America